Nockeby is a residential district in western Stockholm and part of the Bromma borough.

It is part of the Bromma district and has an area of 98 hectares.

See also
Nockeby Light Rail

Districts of Stockholm

Districts in Västerort